Gerhard Krefft (30 March 1912 - 20 March 1993) was a German ichthyologist and herpetologist.

Family
His father was a neurologist, who "was an enthusiastic collector of living reptiles and amphibians", and his mother was a concert singer.

He and his wife Ingeborg were married in 1947, and they had three daughters.

He was the great-nephew of the zoologist, palaeontologist, and Curator of the Australian Museum, Johann Ludwig (Louis) Gerard Krefft (1830–1881).

Professional career
He had more than 160 scientific publications, many of which were "milestone contributions to the taxonomy and zoogeography of oceanic fishes".

Taxon named in his honor 
Nemamyxine kreffti C. B. McMillan & Wisner, 1982, the Krefft's hagfish, is a species of hagfish in the genus Nemamyxine. It is found in the Southwest Atlantic Ocean from off Argentina and southern Brazil.

References

References

External links
 Anton Dohrn: Fisheries Research Vessel: Dr. Gerhard Krefft 30.3.1912 - 20.3.1993, at www.anton-dohrn.de.

1912 births
1993 deaths
Scientists from Hamburg
German ichthyologists
German herpetologists